The 1986–87 Midland Football Combination season was the 50th in the history of Midland Football Combination, a football competition in England.

Premier Division

The Premier Division featured 18 clubs which competed in the division last season along with two new clubs, promoted from Division One:
Bolehall Swifts
Princes End United

Also, Walsall Borough changed name to Walsall Wood, Knowle North Star changed name to Knowle and Smethwick Highfield changed name to Ashtree Highfield.

League table

References

1986–87
8